is a Buddhist temple of the Tendai sect located in Gifu, Gifu Prefecture, Japan. It is also referred to as Mie-ji Kannon (美江寺観音). It is one of the Mino Thirty-three Kannon. The temple houses the Kanshitsu Kannon, which is one of Japan's nationally designated Important Cultural Properties.

See also 
 For an explanation of terms concerning Japanese Buddhism, Japanese Buddhist art, and Japanese Buddhist temple architecture, see the Glossary of Japanese Buddhism.

External links

Images 

Buildings and structures in Gifu
Buddhist temples in Gifu Prefecture
Tendai temples